Marcílio or Marcilio is a Brazilian name which may refer to:

 Marcílio (footballer, born 1976), Brazilian footballer
 Marcílio (footballer, born 1995), Brazilian footballer
 Marcílio Marques Moreira (born 1931), Brazilian economist
 Marcílio Santos (born 1964), Brazilian footballer

See also